Formally known as "His Majesty's Council of Nova Scotia", the Nova Scotia Council (1720–1838) was the original British administrative, legislative and judicial body in Nova Scotia.  The Nova Scotia Council was also known as the Annapolis Council (prior to 1749) and the Halifax Council (after 1749).  After 1749, when the judicial courts were established, the Nova Scotia Council was limited to administrative and legislative powers.

There was no legislative assembly in British-ruled Nova Scotia from the time of the conquest in 1710 until during the Seven Years' War in 1758.  The Lords Commissioners for Trade and Plantations (or simply the Board of Trade) in London through much of the 1750s pressured the various governors in Nova Scotia to establish the General Assembly of Nova Scotia. The lack of civil government with an elected assembly was a drawback to attracting settlers from the older, established colonies of New England where the population was expanding and seeking new lands.  New Englanders wanted guarantees that they would have governmental institutions the same as or similar to what they had become accustomed in New England.  In 1758 the Board of Trade, anxious to attract settlers to found new townships, ordered Col. Charles Lawrence to hold an election and convene an assembly.

When the 1st General Assembly was established in 1758, the Nova Scotia Council became its Upper House until 1838, when the Council was divided into the Executive Council and the Legislative Council.  The Legislative Council was subsequently dissolved in 1928.

Council at Annapolis Royal

Governor Richard Philipps (1720–22) 

 John Lawrence Armstrong 
 Paul Mascarene
 Rev. John Harrison
 John Adams
 Cyprian Southack
 Arthur Savage
 Hibbert Newton (father of Henry Newton)
 William Skene
 William Shirreff
 Peter Boudre

Administrator John Doucett (1722–1725) 
 Paul Mascarene
 William Skene
 Alexander Cosby 
 John Adams
 William Shirreff

Lt. Governor Lawrence Armstrong (1725–1739) 
 Erasmus James Philipps  
 Paul Mascarene
 William Winniett
 William Skene
 John Adams
 William Shirreff
 Otho Hamilton

Lt. Governor Alexander Cosby (1739–1740) 
 Paul Mascarene 
 Erasmus James Philipps 
 John Adams
 William Shirreff
 William Skene
 Otho Hamilton

Lt. Governor Paul Mascarene (1740–1749) 
 John Gorham
 Otho Hamilton
 Henry Cope 
 Erasmus James Philipps
 William Skene
 John Handfield
 Edward Amhurst
 John Salter
 John Adams
 William Shirreff

Council at Halifax

Governor Edward Cornwallis (1749-1752) 
Erasmus James Philipps? 1731-1760
 Paul Mascarene 1749-1760?
 Captain Edward How or Howe 1749-1750 
 John Gorham 1749-1751
 Benjamin Green 1749-1772
 John Salusbury 1749-1753 returned to London
 Hugh Davidson (secretary) 1749-? 
 William Steele 1749-1759
 Peregrine Hopson 1749-1752 named Governor
 Robert Ellison 1749-?
 James F Mercer 1749-?
 Col. John Horseman 1749-? 
 Charles Lawrence 1749-1754 named Lt. Gov.
 John Collier 1752-1768 
 Captain George Fotheringham 1752-?

Governor Peregrine Hopson (1752-1753)
 Sir Danvers Osborn, 3rd Baronet 1752-1753 named Gov. of NY
 William Cotterell 1752-1759  
Robert Monckton 1753-1755 named Lt. Gov.
 John Duport (clerk)

Governor Charles Lawrence (1753-1760) 
 John Rous 1754-1760
 Jonathan Belcher 1754-1761 named Lt. Gov.
Montague Wilmot 1755-1763 named Lt. Gov.
 Charles Morris (1711-81) 1755-1781?
Robert Grant 1756-?
 Richard Bulkeley 1759-1800
Thomas Saul 1759-1760 returned to England
 Joseph Gerrish 1759-1762, 1763

Lt. Governor Jonathan Belcher (1760-1763) 
 Alexander Grant 1761-?
Edm. Crawley 1761-?
Henry Newton 1761-1802
Michael Francklin 1762-1766 named Lt. Gov.

Governor Montague Wilmot (1763-1766) 
William Nesbitt 1763 (declined to serve)
Sebastian Zouberbuhler 1763-1773
Jonathan Binney 1764-1807

Governor William Campbell (1766-1773) 
 Joseph Gorham 1766-1770? named Lt. Gov. of Placentia
Benjamin Gerrish 1768-1772?
 Colonel Arthur Goold or Gould 1772-a/o 1777
John Butler 1772-1781? left Nova Scotia

Governor Francis Legge (1773-1776) 
J. Burrow 1774-?
John Creighton 1775-1788 (last attended 1785)

Lieutenant-Governor Mariot Arbuthnot (1776-1778) 
Bryan Finucane 1778-1785

Lieutenant-Governor Richard Hughes (1778-1781)

Lieutenant-Governor Andrew Hammond (1781-1782) 
Alexander Brymer 1782-1801 left for England

Governor John Parr (1782-1786) 
Edmund Fanning 1783-1786 served as Lt. Gov.
Isaac Deschamps 1783-1785? named  Chief Justice of Supreme Court
Thomas Cochran 1785-1801
Charles Morris (1731–1802) 1785-1802

Lieutenant-Governor John Parr (1786-1791) 
J. Halliburton 1787-?
Henry Duncan 1788-1801
Sampson Salter Blowers 1788-1833

Lieutenant-Governor Sir John Wentworth (1792-1808) 
James Michael Freke Bulkeley clerk 1792-1796
Thomas Strange 1792-1796 returned to England
James De Lancey 1794-1801 resigned for illness
Ben. Wentworth 1795-?
James Brenton 1799-1806
Andrew Belcher 1801-1813
William Forsyth 1801-1808 returned to Scotland 
C. M. Wentworth 1801-?
Lawrence Hartshorne 1801-1804, 1807-1822
Alexander Croke 1802-1815 left NS
Michael Wallace 1803-1831
John Butler Butler 1804-c.1815? left for England
Charles Hill 1807-1825

Lieutenant-Governor George Prévost (1808-1811) 
Richard John Uniacke 1808-1830
Charles Morris (1759–1831) 1808-1831
Charles Inglis 1809-1816 (1st Anglican bishop of NS)
Samuel Hood George (clerk) 1808-1813

Lieutenant-Governor John Coape Sherbrooke (1811-1816) 
James Stewart 1811-1830
Thomas Nickleson Jeffery 1811-1838 transferred to Executive Council
Foster Hutchinson 1813-1815
John Black 1813-1823
Brenton Halliburton 1815-1837 Judges removed from Council
Hon. P. Woodhouse 1815-?

Lieutenant-Governor George Ramsay (1816-1820) 
Robert Stanser 1816-? retired 1824, but left for England 1817. (2nd Anglican bishop of NS)
James Fraser 1818-1822
H. Binney 1819-?

Lieutenant-Governor James Kempt (1820-1828) 
Enos Collins 1822-1838 transferred to Executive Council
Simon Bradstreet Robie 1824-1838 transferred to Executive Council
Charles Ramage Prescott 1825-1838 retired
John Inglis 1825-1838 ? (3rd Anglican bishop of NS)

Lieutenant-Governor Peregrine Maitland (1828-1834) 
Henry Hezekiah Cogswell 1831-1838 transferred to Executive Council

Lieutenant-Governor Colin Campbell (1834-1840) 
1838 Council divided into Executive and Legislative Councils

See also 
 Executive Council of Nova Scotia
Legislative Council of Nova Scotia

References 
Primary reference for section Council at Halifax:

External links
 T.B. Akins. The First Council. Collections of the Nova Scotia Historical Society, Volume 2, pp. 17-30
 Minutes of the Nova Scotia Council
  The Founding of Halifax in 1749 By Arthur Wentworth Hamilton Eaton

Political history of Nova Scotia
Defunct advisory councils in Canada